Francis James "Salty" Parker (July 8, 1912 – July 27, 1992) was a Major League Baseball infielder, coach and manager. His professional baseball career began in the minor leagues in 1930.

Parker played in the Major Leagues for one month from August 13, 1936, through September 16, 1936.  He appeared in 11 games, seven of which were at shortstop, for the Detroit Tigers, collecting seven hits and four RBIs for a .280 batting average and a .333 on-base percentage. Parker was traded from the Tigers on December 2, 1936, to Indianapolis Indians of the American Association, completing a deal that had brought Dizzy Trout to the Tigers. Though Parker only played a month in the Major Leagues, Trout was a Major League pitcher for years, and eventually the Tigers' ace.

After a lengthy minor league managerial career, including a stint managing Leones de Escogido in the Dominican Professional Baseball League (1957–1959), Parker coached for the San Francisco Giants (1958–1961), Cleveland Indians (1962), Los Angeles/California Angels (1964–1966; 1973–1974), New York Mets (1967) and Houston Astros (1968–1972) and served brief stints as manager of the Mets, where he had a 4–7 record in 11 games in 1967 in relief of the departed Wes Westrum, and the Astros, where he won the only game he managed on August 26, 1972, in between the tenures of Harry Walker and Leo Durocher.

After his MLB coaching career, Parker scouted for the Angels and remained active in Houston-area baseball, coaching in the Karl Young League for many years. He died in 1992 at age 80 in Houston.

Managerial record

References

Sources

 Managerial record

 Obituary from Astrosdaily.com

1912 births
1992 deaths
Baseball players from Illinois
Beaumont Exporters players
California Angels coaches
California Angels scouts
Cleveland Indians coaches
Dallas Rebels players
Detroit Tigers players
Houston Astros coaches
Houston Astros managers
Indianapolis Indians players
Los Angeles Angels coaches
Lubbock Hubbers players
Major League Baseball shortstops
Major League Baseball third base coaches
Marshall Tigers players
Moline Plowboys players
Montreal Royals players
New York Mets coaches
New York Mets managers
Pittsburgh Pirates scouts
St. Paul Saints (AA) managers
San Francisco Giants coaches
Shreveport Sports players
Sportspeople from East St. Louis, Illinois
Toledo Mud Hens players
Tulsa Oilers (baseball) players
American expatriate baseball people in the Dominican Republic
Temple Eagles players